Vatsa or Vamsa (Pali and Ardhamagadhi: , literally "calf") was one of the sixteen Mahajanapadas (great kingdoms) of Uttarapatha of ancient India mentioned in the Aṅguttara Nikāya.

Location

History

The early period
The Vatsas were a branch of the Kuru dynasty. During the Rig Vedic period, the Kuru Kingdom comprised the area of Haryana/ Delhi and the Ganga-Jamuna Doab, till Prayag/ Kaushambi, with its capital at Hastinapur. During the late-Vedic period, Hastinapur was destroyed by floods, and the Kuru King  shifted his capital with the entire subjects to a newly constructed capital that was called Kosambi or Kaushambi. In the post Vedic period, when Arya Varta consisted of several Mahajanpads, the Kuru Dynasty was split between Kurus and Vatsas. The Kurus controlled the Haryana/ Delhi/ Upper Doab, while the Vatsas controlled the Lower Doab. Later, The Vatsas were further divided into two branches—One at Mathura, and the other at Kaushambi.

Both of them have described the king Udayana as a scion of the  family. The Puranas provide a list of ’s successors which ends with king .
Other Puranas state that the Vatsa kingdom was named after a  king, Vatsa.

The Mahabharata and the Harivansa states the close connection between the Vatsas and the Bhargas (Bhaggas).

Mahajanapada period

The first ruler of the  dynasty of Vatsa, about whom some definite information available is  II, Parantapa. II married a princess of Videha, who was the mother of Udayana. He also married  , a daughter of the Licchavi chieftain .

The wife of Śatānīka and the mother of Udayana was Queen Mṛgāvatī (in Sanskrit) or Migāvatī (in Prakrit). She was the daughter of Chetaka, the leader of Vaishali. It is recorded that she ruled as a regent for her son for some period of time, although sources differ about the specific circumstances. According to the Jain canonical texts, Udayana was still a minor when Śatānīka died, so "the responsibility of governing the kingdom fell on the shoulders of queen Migāvatī ... till her son grew old enough". On the other hand, Bhāsa's Pratijñāyaugandharāyaṇa says that she took "full charge of the administration" while Udayana was held as a prisoner by King Pradyota of Avanti, and "the way in which she discharged her duties excited the admiration of even experienced ministers". Mrigavati, is notable for being one of the earliest known female rulers in Indian history.

Udayana

Udayana, the son of  II by the Videha princess succeeded him.

Later history
Later, the Vatsa kingdom was annexed by the Avanti kingdom.

Vatsa was ultimately annexed into Magadha by Shishunaga.

See also
Kingdoms of Ancient India

References

Citations

Sources
 

Kingdoms of the Puru clan
Mahajanapadas
Former kingdoms